Terellia rhapontici is a species of tephritid or fruit flies in the genus Terellia of the family Tephritidae.

Distribution
Switzerland.

References

Tephritinae
Insects described in 1990
Diptera of Europe